Andreas Sigismund Marggraf (3 March 1709 – 7 August 1782) was a German chemist from Berlin, then capital of the Margraviate of Brandenburg, and a pioneer of analytical chemistry. He isolated zinc in 1746 by heating calamine and carbon. Though he was not the first to do so, Marggraf is credited with carefully describing the process and establishing its basic theory. In 1747, Marggraf announced his discovery of sugar in beets and devised a method using alcohol to extract it.  His student Franz Achard later devised an economical industrial method to extract the sugar in its pure form.

Life
Andreas Sigismund Marggraf was the son of the pharmacist Henning Christian Marggraf (1680–1754), who owned a pharmacy in Berlin and lectured at the Collegium Medico-Chirurgicum (medical/surgical school). Andreas came in contact with the pharmaceutical and medical business early and started studying at the medical school in 1725. He studied with Caspar Neumann in Berlin, Germany but he also visited pharmacies in other cities, including Frankfurt am Main and Strassbourg. He also attended lectures at the University of Halle. Andreas worked in his father's pharmacy and focused his work on chemistry. Later in his life he helped to reorganize the Societät der Wissenschaften into the Akademie der Wissenschaften (Prussian Academy of Science) and became the director of the physics section in 1760.
Even after a stroke in 1774, he continued work in the laboratories of the Akademie until his retirement in 1781.

Scientific work
Marggraf introduced several new methods into experimental chemistry. He used precipitation methods for analysis, like the Prussian blue reaction for the detection of iron.  Marggraf's major work in inorganic chemistry included the improved production of phosphorus from urine and the detection of alkali metal salts in plant ash and their identification by flame test.

His extraction of sugar from beets, which was then only available from sugarcane, was the starting point for the sugar industry in Europe, and the modern sugar industry in the world. Although Marggraf recognized the economic impact of that discovery, he did not pursue it.  Marggraf's student Franz Achard, completed the work and developed an economic extraction method for sugar from sugar beet. Other students of Marggraf included Johann Gottlob Lehmann, Franz Carl Achard and probably Valentin Rose the Elder and Martin Heinrich Klaproth. He also was the first to isolate glucose from raisins in 1747.

Isolation of zinc

Marggraf had isolated zinc in 1746 by heating a mixture of calamine and carbon in a closed vessel without copper. He was unaware that the same process had been developed (and patented) by William Champion in England around 1738–1740 and by Anton von Swab in Sweden around 1742. Marggraf however had described the process in great detail and established its basic theory, for which he is often credited with isolation of zinc. This procedure became commercially practical by 1752.

References

1709 births
1782 deaths
18th-century German chemists
Scientists from Berlin
People of the Industrial Revolution
People from the Margraviate of Brandenburg
Members of the Prussian Academy of Sciences
Honorary members of the Saint Petersburg Academy of Sciences
18th-century agronomists